KHUB (1340 AM) is a radio station broadcasting a country music format. Licensed to Fremont, Nebraska, United States, the station serves the Fremont area with fringe coverage to west Omaha. The station is currently owned by Steven W. Seline, through licensee Walnut Radio, LLC, and features programming from ABC Radio, Salem Communications, and Westwood One.

History
The station was founded under the call letters KORN; while a contemporaneous industry publication lists the on-air date as December 22, 1939, Federal Communications Commission records state that the station was licensed on September 23, 1947. The call letters were later changed to KFGT. In 1958, the station took the callsign KHUB; it had originally belonged to a station in Watsonville, California, now KOMY (coincidentally, also on 1340 kHz).

On January 1, 2014, KHUB changed its format from news/talk to classic hits. On February 1, 2018, KHUB changed its format from classic hits to country, branded as "The Big Dog", simulcasting on FM translator K255DF 98.9 FM Fremont.

Previous Logo

References

External links

Fremont, Nebraska
Country radio stations in the United States
HUB
Radio stations established in 1947
1947 establishments in Nebraska
Dodge County, Nebraska